= Lelo N =

Lelo Ndlovu known as Lelo N is a South African businesswoman and media personality. She is the founder of W.O.W Africa (Workshops of Wealth), an organization focused on advancing African women in business and leadership. She was awarded the 2025 Icon of African Economic Advancement award by Iconic Global Summit & Honors.
